Rheidae  is a family of flightless ratite birds which first appeared in the Paleocene. It is today represented by the sole living genus Rhea, but also contains several extinct genera.

Taxonomy
Order Rheiformes (Forbes, 1884) Furbringer, 1888 [Rheimorphae Bonaparte, 1849; Rheae Forbes 1884]
 Family †Opisthodactylidae Ameghino 1895
 Genus ?†Diogenornis de Alvarenga 1983 (Late Paleocene) – possibly a member of Casuariiformes instead.
 Genus †Opisthodactylus Ameghino 1895 (Miocene) – rheid?
  Family Rheidae (Bonaparte 1849) Bonaparte, 1853
 Genus †Heterorhea Rovereto 1914 (Pliocene)
 Genus †Hinasuri Tambussi 1995
 Genus Rhea Brisson 1760

References 

 
Ratites
Bird families

Extant Thanetian first appearances
Taxa named by Charles Lucien Bonaparte
Notopalaeognathae